Yog Sandesh is a monthly magazine published in India.

History and profile
The Yog Sandesh was first published in September 2003. The magazine is published by the Divya Yog Mandir Trust. It covers yoga, pranayama, ayurveda, culture, rituals and spirituality. The magazine published in fourteen languages, including English, Gujrati, Marathi, Punjabi, Bengali, Oriya, Assamese, Nepali, Kannada and Telugu. It has a monthly readership of more than a million in India and abroad. This magazine is inspired by Baba Ramdev and the editor of this magazine is Acharya Balkrishna.

References

External links
 Official website

Monthly magazines published in India
Magazines about spirituality
Magazines established in 2003
Multilingual magazines